Commentary on Romans may refer to the following commentaries on Epistle to the Romans:
Commentary on Romans (Origen), by Origen
Commentary on Romans, by Ambrosiaster
Commentary on Romans (Pelagius), by Pelagius
Commentary on Romans (Luther), by Martin Luther
Commentary on Romans (Calvin), by John Calvin
Commentary on Romans (Barth), by Karl Barth

Epistle to the Romans